The College Inn (formerly known as Ye College Inn) is a nationally recognized historic building in Seattle. It is located at the Northeast corner of University Way ne and NE 40th Street in the University District one block west of the University of Washington. Built by local developer Charles Cowen (namesake of Cowen Park), It was designed in 1909 by Graham & Myers and is an excellent example of Tudor Revival architecture used on a commercial building. Graham & Myers would design at least 50 houses for Cowen's University Park subdivision. At the time of its construction, the university campus was the site of the Alaska–Yukon–Pacific Exposition and Ye College Inn was intended to function as a small hotel for fairgoers. It later provided housing for students as well as commercial services on the lower floor.  Currently it houses a boutique hotel (College Inn Hotel), three cafes, and a pub. Following a complete restoration in 1979, The College Inn was listed on the National Register of Historic Places in 1982.

See also
National Register of Historic Places listings in Seattle

References

National Register of Historic Places in Seattle
Hotel buildings completed in 1909
1900s architecture in the United States
Tudor Revival architecture in Washington (state)
Hotels in Seattle
Hotel buildings on the National Register of Historic Places in Washington (state)
Alaska–Yukon–Pacific Exposition